The Inter-Alpha Group of Banks was created in 1971 by six banks in the European Community to provide a platform for the regular exchange of ideas and to explore areas for cooperation between its member banks. The group is a non-hierarchical association and is maintained by mutual agreement with each bank retaining full autonomy and independence.

It was one of the banking clubs set up during the 1960s and 1970s when a number of European banks attempted to cooperate at an international level.

Function 

The group's function has evolved to: 
 Provide a platform for the regular exchange of ideas at the executive and senior management level 
 Allow specialists to meet and discuss topics of particular interest 
 Establish areas of cooperation, particularly in international trade 
 Train bank management through annual Inter-Alpha Banking School and annual Inter-Alpha Banking Management Programme at INSEAD at Fontainebleau near Paris 
 Create a framework for individual banks within the Group to work together

Members
Membership of the group has grown to eleven banks, representing 15 European countries:
 AIB Group, Ireland
 Novo Banco, Portugal
 Commerzbank, Germany
 ING Group, Netherlands
 Intesa Sanpaolo, Italy
 KBC Bank, Belgium
 Nordea, Norway, Denmark, Finland and Sweden
 National Bank of Greece, Greece
 NatWest Group, UK (via Williams & Glyn's Bank) 
 Santander, Spain
 Société Générale, France

See also

 ABECOR
 European Financial Services Roundtable
 Financial market
 Financial services

References

 Mauro Guillén, The Rise of Spanish Multinationals, European Business in the Global Economy

External links
 Inter-Alpha Group of Banks

Organizations established in 1971